Aleksandr Vladimirovich Beskrovny (born 29 January 1971) is a Russian professional football coach and a former player who last worked as an assistant manager with FC Vybor-Kurbatovo Voronezh. He made his professional debut in the Soviet First League in 1989 for FC Spartak Vladikavkaz.

References

1971 births
Sportspeople from Vladikavkaz
Living people
Soviet footballers
Association football defenders
Russian footballers
Russian Premier League players
FC Spartak Vladikavkaz players
FC Fakel Voronezh players
FC Chernomorets Novorossiysk players
FC Salyut Belgorod players
FC Volgar Astrakhan players
Russian football managers